Badra is a census town in Shahdol district  in the state of Madhya Pradesh, India.

Geography

Demographics
 India census, Badra had a population of 4755. Males constitute 53% of the population and females 47%. Badra has an average literacy rate of 58%, lower than the national average of 59.5%; with 63% of the males and 37% of females literate. 14% of the population is under 6 years of age.

References

Cities and towns in Shahdol district
Shahdol